Lokabi Lambodar Chakroborty was the famous kavial of Birbhum . He was famous at his time and ever. Nowadays kavials takes his name at bandana gaan. There is a primary school "Lokokabi Lambodar Chackroborty primary school" at kharun near Rampurhat at Birbhum.

References

Bengali culture
Culture of West Bengal